The Indian Economic Service (abbreviated as IES, I.E.S.) is an inter-ministerial and inter-departmental central civil service under Group A  of the executive branch of the Government of India. The unique aspect of the service is that the cadre posts are spread across various departments and ministries of central government numbering more than 55. It is a highly specialised and professional service within the government of India catering to economic analysis and policy advice.

History

The Indian Economic Service was introduced by Prime Minister Jawaharlal Nehru for formulating and implementing economic policies and programmes in India. The initial steps towards formation of service can be traced to 1952. A Committee under V. T. Krishnamachari submitted a report in September 1953, recommending the formation of a service to be known as the Statistical and Economic Advisory Service. On the contrary, Prasanta Mahalanobis did not favour the idea of a combined Statistical and Economic Advisory Service.

The Cabinet in its meeting held on 12 February 1958 decided that two separate services should be formed; a Statistical Service and other an Economic Service. The Indian Economic Service was constituted on 1 November 1961 and the Service Rules were notified on the same date. The actual operationalization of service took place in 1964.

Until 2009, the post of Chief Economic Advisor to the Government of India was a Union Public Service Commission appointment and until the 1970s almost all CEAs were members of the Indian Economic Service.

Recruitment

The UPSC conducts a separate Economics Service exam. The minimum eligibility criterion is a post graduate degree in Economics and allied subjects.

Various Grades in the IES

Training 
The direct recruits undergo a comprehensive probationary training comprising various phases ranging from Foundation Course (along with All India Services and Central Civil Services) to Applied Economics at the Institute of Economic Growth (IEG). The training programme also comprises various attachments with institutions of repute all across the country. The training course also has international attachment with Civil Service College, Singapore.

Notable members 
 I. G. Patel – 14th governor of Reserve Bank of India 
 Manmohan Singh - Economic advisor, Ministry of Foreign Trade, India (1971–1972)
 Montek Singh Ahluwalia - Economic adviser in the Ministry of Finance (1979)
 P. N. Dhar - Economic adviser in Prime Minister's Secretariat (1970)
 Samar Ranjan Sen – Former executive director of the World Bank for India, Bangladesh and Sri Lanka.
 R. M. Honavar – 6th Chief Economic Adviser to Government of India
 R.K. Chandolia - Private secretary to Andimuthu Raja and accused in 2G spectrum case

References

Notes

External links
 Indian Economic Service 

Central Civil Services (India)
Economy of India